Valentin Brück (April 23, 1911 – July 20, 1980) was a German politician of the Christian Democratic Union (CDU) and former member of the German Bundestag.

Life 
In 1949 he joined the CDU and became secretary in the district association of Cologne-Ehrenfeld-North. In 1950, he became managing director, later chairman, of the CDU Rhineland Regional Civil Servants Committee and member of the CDU Federal Committee for Public Administration.

Brück was a member of the German Bundestag from 1953 to 1969 and again from 14 August 1970 to 1972.

Literature

References

1911 births
1980 deaths
Members of the Bundestag for North Rhine-Westphalia
Members of the Bundestag 1969–1972
Members of the Bundestag 1965–1969
Members of the Bundestag 1961–1965
Members of the Bundestag 1957–1961
Members of the Bundestag 1953–1957
Members of the Bundestag for the Christian Democratic Union of Germany